Maigret's Dead Man (French: Maigret et son mort) is a 1948 detective novel by the Belgian novelist Georges Simenon featuring his fictional character Jules Maigret. Also translated as Maigret and His Dead Man or Maigret’s Special Murder, it was Simenon's 29th Maigret novel.

Plot
A man telephones for Maigret from a café and saying that he is being followed. Without finishing the call he hangs up. He attempts to call Maigret from different cafés, then the calls cease. Then a body is found in the Place de la Concorde badly beaten and stabbed. It was observed being dumped from a car.

Adaptations
Maigret's Dead Man has been dramatized five times:
 In 1961, in the BBC television series Maigret with Rupert Davies, as "The Winning Ticket"
 In the Dutch TV series starring Jan Teulings in 1966
 In the French TV series starring Jean Richard in 1970
 In 1978, in the Japanese series starring Kinya Aikawa as Keishi to satsujinshatachi ("Killers")
 The second episode of ITV's 2016 series Maigret with Rowan Atkinson as Maigret.

References

1948 Belgian novels
Maigret novels
Belgian novels adapted into films
Presses de la Cité books